The Anna Wintour Costume Center is a wing of the Metropolitan Museum of Art's main building in Manhattan that houses the collection of the Costume Institute. The center is named after Anna Wintour, the longtime and current editor-in-chief of Vogue, artistic director of Condé Nast, and chair of the museum's annual Met Gala (often called the "Met Ball") since 1995. It was endowed by Lizzie and Jonathan Tisch. As of August 2017, the chief curator is Andrew Bolton.

The center was formally opened by the First Lady of the United States Michelle Obama on May 5, 2014. Guests included Sarah Jessica Parker, Diane Von Furstenberg, Tory Burch, Zac Posen, Ralph Lauren, and Donatella Versace.

History

In 1902, wealthy philanthropists Irene and Alice Lewisohn began to volunteer at the Henry Street Settlement House in New York, a community center that provided social services and healthcare to immigrant families. Alice, who acted in plays herself, began working as a drama teacher, while Irene devoted herself to dance productions. In 1914, the sisters bought a lot on the corner of Grand and Pitt Streets and donated it to the Settlement for building a new theater. The Neighborhood Playhouse opened in 1915. By 1920, the theater employed professional actors, and it was known for its experimental productions and its revue "The Grand Street Follies." Theater designer Aline Bernstein served her apprenticeship there from 1915 to 1924 designing costumes and stage sets.

The Playhouse closed in 1927, but the company continued to produce plays on Broadway under the management of Helen F. Ingersoll. In 1928, with Rita Wallach Morganthau, the Lewisohns established the Neighborhood Playhouse School of the Theatre at East 54th Street, where it became an actor training school and students were offered a two-year program formal drama and dance training to become professionals.

During their years of running the school theatre and producing plays, a body of knowledge was formed about acting, theater production, and costume, set and stage design. In 1937, Irene Lewisohn opened a home for this library, the Museum of Costume Art, on Fifth Avenue. Aline Bernstein served as the first President and Polaire Weissman as its first executive director. After Irene Lewisohn's death in 1944, Lord & Taylor president Dorothy Shaver worked to bring the collection to the Metropolitan Museum of Art. Shaver believed that this would strengthen the American fashion industry and raised $350,000 from New York garment manufacturers to finance the transaction. The Costume Art museum was became part of the Metropolitan Museum of Art in 1946, becoming The Costume Institute but was independently run until 1959 when it became a curatorial department in the museum. The Met is now home to the Irene Lewisohn Costume Reference Library.

Since 1946, with help from the fashion publicist Eleanor Lambert, the institute has hosted the annual Met Gala to raise money for operating expenses.

In 2008, the American Costume Collection of the Brooklyn Museum merged into the Costume Institute, a cost-saving scheme coming after years of close collaboration between the two organizations. The collection of the Brooklyn museum is older, having been formed from private donations by former New York high society personalities, beginning with the donation in 1903 of an 1892 cream crepe dress worn by Kate Mallory Williams at her graduation from Brooklyn Heights Seminary. Prior to the move, 23,500 objects from the Brooklyn collection were digitized and these images are now shared by both organizations. At the time of the merger, the Met costume collection consisted of 31,000 objects from the 17th-century onwards. The opening exhibition in 2014 featured work by British-born designer Charles James, an important figure in New York fashion of the 1940s and 1950s and whose work is in the Brooklyn collection.

On September 8, 2015, it was announced that Harold Koda would be stepping down from his position as Curator in Charge of the Costume Institute. Andrew Bolton, who had joined the Costume Institute in 2002 as associate curator and was made curator in 2006, was announced as his replacement.

In May 2017, the Costume Institute featured an exhibition featuring the works of Rei Kawakubo/Comme des Garçons. The exhibit was the Costume Institute's first exhibition focusing on a living designer since Yves Saint Laurent in 1983.

List of exhibitions

 1971–1972: Fashion Plate (October 1971 – January 1972)
 1972–1973: Untailored Garments (January–July 1972)
 1973–1974: The World of Balenciaga (March–September 1973)
 1974–1975: Romantic and Glamorous Hollywood Design (November 1974 – August 1975)
 1975–1976: American Women of Style (December 1975 – August 1976)
 1976–1977: The Glory of Russian Costume (December 1976 – August 1977)
 1977–1978: Vanity Fair: A Treasure Trove (December 1977 – September 1978)
 1978–1979: Diaghilev: Costumes and Designs of the Ballets Russes (November 1978 – June 1979)
 1979–1980: Fashions of the Habsburg Era: Austria-Hungary (December 1979 – August 1980) 
 1980–1981: The Manchu Dragon: Costumes of China, the Chi'ng Dynasty (December 1980 – August 1981)
 1981–1982: The Eighteenth-Century Woman (December 1981 – September 1982)
 1982–1983: Le Belle Époque (December 1982 – September 1983)
 1983–1984: Yves Saint Laurent: 25 Years of Design (December 1983 – September 1984)
 1984–1985: Man and the Horse (December 1984 – September 1985)
 1985–1986: Costumes of Royal India (December 1985 – August 1986)
 1986–1987: Dance (December 1986 – September 1987)
 1987–1988: In Style: Celebrating Fifty Years of the Costume Institute (November 1987 – April 1988)
 1988–1989: [http://libmma.contentdm.oclc.org/cdm/compoundobject/collection/p15324coll10/id/69547/rec/235 From Queen to Empress: Victorian Dress 1837–1877] (December 1988 – April 1989)
 1989–1990: The Age of Napoleon: Costume from Revolution to Empire, 1789–1815 (December 1989 – April 1990)
 1990–1991: Théâtre de la Mode – Fashion Dolls: The Survival of Haute Couture (December 1990 – April 1991)
 1991–1992: Gala held, but no concurrent costume exhibition
 1992–1993: Fashion and History: A Dialogue (December 1992 – March 1993)
 1993–1994: Diana Vreeland: Immoderate Style (December 1993 – March 1994)
 1994–1995: Orientalism: Visions of the East in western dress (December 1994 – March 1995)
 1995–1996: Haute Couture (December 1995 – March 1996)
 1996–1997: Christian Dior (December 1996 – March 1997)
 1997–1998: Gianni Versace (December 1997 – March 1998)
 1998–1999: Cubism and Fashion (December 10, 1998 – March 14, 1999)
 1999–2000: Rock Style (December 9, 1999 – March 19, 2000) 
 2000–2001: No costume exhibition presented
 2001: Jacqueline Kennedy: The White House Years (May 1 – July 29, 2001)
 2001–2002: No costume exhibition gala presented
 2003: Goddess: The Classical Mode (May 1 – August 3, 2003)
 2004: Dangerous Liaisons: Fashion and Furniture in the 18th Century (April 2? – August 8, 2004)
 2005: The House of Chanel (May 5 – August 7, 2005)
 2005–2006: Rara Avis: Selections from the Iris Barrel Apfel Collection (September 13, 2005 – January 22, 2006)
2006: AngloMania: Tradition and Transgression in British Fashion (May 3 – September 6, 2006)
 2007: Poiret: King of Fashion (May 9 – August 5, 2007)
 2008: Superheroes: Fashion and Fantasy (May 7 – September 1, 2008)
 2009: The Model As Muse: Embodying Fashion (May 6 – August 9, 2009)
 2010: American Woman: Fashioning a National Identity (May 5 – August 10, 2010)
 2011: Alexander McQueen: Savage Beauty (May 4 – August 7, 2011)
 2012: Schiaparelli and Prada: Impossible Conversations (May 10 – August 19, 2012)
 2013: Punk: Chaos to Couture (May 9 – August 14, 2013)
 2014: Charles James: Beyond Fashion (May 8 – August 10, 2014)
 2014–2015: Death Becomes Her: A Century of Mourning Attire (October 21, 2014 – February 1, 2015)
 2015: China: Through the Looking Glass• (May 7 – September 7, 2015)
 2015–2016: Jacqueline de Ribes: The Art of Style (November 19, 2015 – February 21, 2016)
 2016: Manus x Machina: Fashion In An Age Of Technology (May 5 – September 5, 2016)
2016–2017: Masterworks: Unpacking Fashion (November 18, 2016 – February 5, 2017)
 2017: Rei Kawakubo/Comme des Garçons: Art of the In-Between (May 4 – September 4, 2017)
 2018: Heavenly Bodies: Fashion and the Catholic Imagination (May 10 – October 8, 2018)
 2019: Camp: Notes on Fashion (May 8 – September 9, 2019)
 2020: About Time: Fashion and Duration 
 2021–2022 In America: A Lexicon of Fashion (part one of a two part exhibition)

 2022 In America: An Anthology of Fashion (part two of a two part exhibition)

References

External links

 Charles James: Beyond Fashion—Link to the 2014 opening exhibition, honoring the work of Charles James
 Guide to the Metropolitan Museum of Art
 Digital collections of the Costume Institute
 Costume Institute Records, 1937–2011 from The Metropolitan Museum of Art Archives, New York.

1937 establishments in New York City
Fashion museums in the United States
Metropolitan Museum of Art
Museums established in 1937